Hungary competed at the 1956 Summer Olympics in Melbourne, Australia, and Stockholm, Sweden (equestrian events). 108 competitors, 88 men and 20 women, took part in 80 events in 12 sports.

Medalists

|  style="text-align:left; width:78%; vertical-align:top;"|

Default sort order: Medal, Date, Name

| style="text-align:left; width:22%; vertical-align:top;"|

Multiple medalists
The following competitors won multiple medals at the 1956 Olympic Games.

Athletics

Boxing

Canoeing

Sprint
Men

Women

Diving

Men

Fencing

18 fencers, 16 men and 2 women, represented Hungary in 1956.

Men's foil
 József Gyuricza
 Mihály Fülöp
 Lajos Somodi, Sr.

Men's team foil
 Endre Tilli, József Sákovics, József Gyuricza, Mihály Fülöp, Lajos Somodi, Sr., József Marosi

Men's épée
 Lajos Balthazár
 József Sákovics
 Béla Rerrich

Men's team épée
 József Sákovics, Béla Rerrich, Lajos Balthazár, Ambrus Nagy, József Marosi, Barnabás Berzsenyi

Men's sabre
 Rudolf Kárpáti
 Aladár Gerevich
 Pál Kovács

Men's team sabre
 Aladár Gerevich, Rudolf Kárpáti, Pál Kovács, Attila Keresztes, Jenő Hámori, Dániel Magay

Women's foil
 Lídia Sákovicsné Dömölky
 Magda Nyári-Kovács

Gymnastics

Modern pentathlon

Three male pentathletes represented Hungary in 1956.

Individual
 Gábor Benedek
 János Bódy
 Antal Moldrich

Team
 Gábor Benedek
 János Bódy
 Antal Moldrich

Rowing

Hungary had four male rowers participate in one out of seven rowing events in 1956.

Men

Shooting

Five shooters represented Hungary in 1956.
Men

Swimming

Water polo

Wrestling

References

External links
Official Olympic Reports
International Olympic Committee results database

Nations at the 1956 Summer Olympics
1956
1956 in Hungarian sport